Green Ghost is a board game for up to 4 players, first published in 1965 by Transogram. Green Ghost is the first board game designed to be played in the dark.

History 
Transogram mass-produced the game in 1965, then sold its toy interests to Marx Toys in 1970. In Australia, the game was distributed by the Ideal Toy Company. 

In 1997 Marx Toys produced a 30th Anniversary edition of the game (MCMXCVII, Item #3905). This box has "Find Kelly the Ghost... if you DARE" printed on it. 

Green Ghost remains collectible, but with so many different editions it is difficult for collectors to know if they have a complete set.

Features and gameplay 
Original television commercials for the game encouraged players to play it in the dark. The 1965 box has printed on it "THE EXCITING GAME OF MYSTERY THAT GLOWS IN THE DARK." 

The central character in the game was modeled on The Blob and the design was aimed at the campy horror genre of shows like The Addams Family.

The board is of the 3D type in that it features standing scenery and is designed to appear as a spooky town. The luminous plastic board is elevated on six stilts and underneath are three boxes, covered by locked trapdoors. The pits contain either plastic bones, "bat" feathers or rubber snakes, plus a number of hidden "ghost kids" (one of which is "Kelly", the Green Ghost's child).  

Spinning the large Green Ghost gives you the number of spaces you can move your pawn: vulture, rat, cat, or bat. Players use trapdoor keys to collect ghost kids and increase their chances of winning. When all twelve ghost kids have been retrieved from the traps, they are placed in little holes on the Green Ghost spinner (players need to remember which ghost kids are found). Then the large Green Ghost is spun one more time, pointing to the little ghost it identifies as Kelly. Whoever found the one pointed to wins the game.

References

External links 
 Green Ghost at BoardGameGeek.
 Home video of game board  at YouTube.

Board games introduced in 1965
Children's board games
Horror board games